Temple Adath Israel is a Reform Jewish synagogue in Cleveland, Mississippi.

The  Congregation was organized in 1923; a Hebrew school had been started the previous year. The congregation's Byzantine Revival synagogue was built in 1927. An annex, designed by architect Harold Kaplan of Greenville, Mississippi was completed in 1949–1950. 

The Temple was listed on the National Register of Historic Places on December 12, 2002.

History

Plans for an organized Jewish community around Cleveland began in 1922, when three members of the community decided to create a Hebrew school for Bolivar County. Working with a Rabbi out of Greenville, Mississippi, they held classes in the Cleveland Consolidated School. This developed into a desire for religious services for Jews within a 50-mile radius of Cleveland. Services were originally held in a local high school auditorium, with Rabbi Rabinowitz from Greenville coming up to lead services. Between 1926 and 1927, congregants raised money to build a synagogue. The Temple was dedicated on February 6, 1927.

At one point, Adath Israel had one of the largest temple youth groups in Mississippi.

Today, Temple Adath Israel has a congregation of about 18-22 families.

Gallery

References

Byzantine Revival synagogues
Properties of religious function on the National Register of Historic Places in Mississippi
Synagogues on the National Register of Historic Places
Reform synagogues in Mississippi
Synagogues completed in 1927
1927 establishments in Mississippi
National Register of Historic Places in Bolivar County, Mississippi
Cleveland, Mississippi